Cenarchaeum symbiosum is a species of Archaea in the genus Cenarchaeum, in the phylum Nitrososphaerota in the domain Archaea. C. symbiosum is psychrophilic and is found inhabiting marine sponges.

Genome 
The genome of C. symbiosum is estimated to be 2.02 Million bp in length, with a predicted amount of 2011 genes.

Ecology 
Cenarchaeum symbiosum is a psychrophilic organism capable of surviving and proliferating at low temperatures usually ranging from 7-19 Celsius. C. symbiosum has a symbiotic relationship with certain varieties of sponge species, usually living in 10-20 meter depths, typically near California.

References

Further reading 
 
 
 

Archaea
Thermoproteota